Wyoming Highway 74 (WYO 74) is an extremely short unsigned Wyoming state highway known as East Bridge Avenue in the town of Saratoga.

Route description 
WYO 74 begins at Highway 130, locally known as 1st Street. It proceeds east as Bridge Avenue, with the first block not maintained by WYDOT, but  locally. However, the approaches and the bridge over the North Platte River are maintained by WYDOT.  Highway 74 then terminates at County Route 504 (Carbon County, Wyoming)|County Route 504.

History
Wyoming Highway 74 was once part of Wyoming Highway 130 between Saratoga and Ryan Park, before that designation was moved south to its present-day routing.

Major intersections

References

External links

 WYO 74 - WYO 130 to North Platte River Bridge/(CR 504)

Transportation in Carbon County, Wyoming
074
State highways in the United States shorter than one mile